Cardiotoxicity is the occurrence of heart dysfunction as electric or muscle damage, resulting in heart toxicity. The heart becomes weaker and is not as efficient in pumping blood. Cardiotoxicity may be caused by chemotherapy (a usual example is the class of anthracyclines) treatment and/or radiotherapy; complications from anorexia nervosa; adverse effects of heavy metals intake; the long-term abuse of or ingestion at high doses of certain strong stimulants such as cocaine; or an incorrectly administered drug such as bupivacaine.

One of the ways to detect cardiotoxicity at early stages when there is a subclinical dysfunction is by measuring changes in regional function of the heart using strains.

See also
 Cardiotoxin III
 Batrachotoxin
 Heart failure
 Drug interaction

References

Heart diseases
Toxins by organ system affected